A leadership election was held in the Civic Democratic Party (ODS) on 19 November 2006 following the 2006 legislative elections. Incumbent leader Mirek Topolánek ran unopposed and received 70% of the vote. Topolánek then started to negotiate a coalition government.

Results

References

2006
Civic Democratic Party leadership election
Single-candidate elections
Indirect elections
Elections in Prague
Civic Democratic Party leadership election
Civic Democratic Party leadership election